Lebanon is a parliamentary democracy within an overall confessionalist framework; as a form of consociationalism, the highest offices are proportionately reserved for representatives from religious communities.

However, increasing numbers of Lebanese organize against this confessionalist system and for secularism in the national government.

In April 2010, Laïque Pride, a secular group co-founded by feminist Yalda Younes, called for "an end to the country's deep-rooted sectarian system" and for a "secular Lebanon". Laïque Pride supports the enacting of a unified Civil Code for the Personal Status Law.

On April 26, 2010, in response to Hizb ut-Tahrir's growing appeal in Beirut and demands to re-establish an Islamic caliphate, a Laïque Pride march was held in Beirut. Three days later, 70,000 gathered in Martyrs' Square, Beirut for a march organized by Laïque Pride.

In 2011, hundreds of protesters rallied in Beirut on 27 February in a Laïque Pride march, calling for reform of the country's confessional political system. At the same time, a peaceful sit-in took place in Saida. 

At a march in May 2012 in which 600 participated, Laïque Pride issued six demands, four concerning women's rights and two concerning media freedom. Secular student clubs from Saint Joseph University (USJ), the Lebanese Academy of Fine Arts (ALBA), as the American University of Beirut (AUB) also participated in the march.

According to some scholars, such as Maya Mikdashi,  the Laique Pride movement in Lebanon demanded, what she calls, an “Evangelical Secularism”. According to this notion, the individuals should first abolish their sectarian attachments and only then they can become secular citizens. What is characteristic for Evangelical secularists in this movement was the fact that secularism was put in contrast to sectarianism and not to religion as such.

Student organizations

Student organizations have played a key role in secular movements in Lebanon, particularly those at the American University of Beirut.

One of these secular originations is the Secular Club, a progressive student organization established after the 2008 conflict. According to former club president Joumana Talhouk, the goal of the club is "to create a political space where people from different social and sectarian backgrounds can unite under common principles".

Another organization is the far-left Red Oak Club. According to former president Theresa Sahyoun, the Red Oak Club and the  Secular Club managed to find common ground and endorse the August 2016 Martyrs' Square protest.

See also 

 Christianity in Lebanon
 Civil Center for National Initiative
 Constitution of Lebanon
 Culture of Lebanon
 Demographics of Lebanon
 Freedom of religion in Lebanon
 Irreligion in Lebanon
 Islam and secularism
 Politics in Lebanon 
 Religion in Lebanon
 Sectarianism in Lebanon
 Secularity
 Separation of church and state

References

Lebanon
Lebanon
Lebanon
Lebanon
Lebanon
Social history of Lebanon